Altenstadt is a municipality in the Weilheim-Schongau district, in Bavaria, Germany.

History
Altenstadt ("Old Town") is the former Schongau - a large proportion of residents moved in the 13th century only a few kilometers further and founded a new settlement at the River Lech, and took the town's name as well.

A significant sight is the Romanesque basilica minor of St. Michael with remains of medieval wall painting and several examples of Romanesque sculpture.

References

Weilheim-Schongau
Displaced persons camps in the aftermath of World War II